Dar es Salaam bus rapid transit is a bus rapid transit system that began operations on 10 May 2016 in Dar es Salaam, Tanzania. The transit system consists of 6 phases and the construction of the first phase began in April 2012 by the Austrian construction company Strabag International GmbH. Construction of the first phase was completed in December 2015 at a total cost of €134 million funded by the African Development Bank, World Bank and the Government of Tanzania. The first phase of the project has a total length of 21.1 kilometers with dedicated bus lanes on three trunk routes with a total of 29 stations. The entire system is operated by The Usafiri salama Dar es Salaam Rapid Transit (UDA-RT) under the surveillance of the Surface and Marine Transport regulatory authority (Sumatra) Currently, the route is serviced by a fleet of 140 Chinese built Golden Dragon buses, providing express and local service for 18 hours daily from 05:00am to 11:00pm. In September 2022, BRT Fleet size had increased to 305.

History 

With the rapidly growing population of the city, the government began to draw plans for a rapid transit system in 2003. The government predicted the city population to grow over 5 million by 2015 and invited the Japan International Cooperation Agency to design a master plan for transport in the city in June 2008. A bus rapid transit and a metro transit system were proposed but the metro system was not approved due to the high construction and operational cost involved. The project was placed under the Prime Minister's office and a Dar Rapid Transit Agency (DART) was created through a government notice on 25 May 2007. A 130 km bus rapid transit was planned to cover over 90% of the city's population and the project was split into six phases due to the large investment required. The initial project cost was financed by the world bank and the bank provided $180 million for the construction of the first phase.

Phases

Phase I 
Phase I of the BRT system runs for 21 km from Kimara to Ubungo ending at Kivukoni/Morocco. Construction of the first phase began in April 2012 and was completed in December 2015 by Strabag international GmbH. The route is designed to carry 300,000 commuters daily along 29 stations. The route consists of 21 km of trunk road, 57.9 km of feeder roads, 5 large terminals and 29 stations. The route was placed under interim operations on 24 April 2015 and was fully operational on 10 May 2016, after the fares were decided.

Interim Operations
On 24 April 2015 the Dar Rapid Transit Agency (DART) signed a contract with UDA-RT for the provision of Interim services of the Dar es salaam Rapid Transit system. UDA-RT is a special purpose company formed by UDA and the two Daladala Associations, the Dar es Salaam Commuter Bus Owners Association (DARCOBOA) and UWADAR for the provision of interim services.  The interim service was conducted to provide training to future operators and build up local capacity. During interim operations the private dala-dalas were still operational on these routes.

Phase II 
Funds for the Second phase were secured in October 2015. The second phase is to run for approximately 19 km from Kilwa to Kawawa south via Kivukoni and is to cost around $160 million. The African Development Bank agreed to fund $141 million for the project, while the remaining funds will come from the government. Construction for the project is due to begin in June 2019 and will take approximately 36 months to complete. Construction of the road will include two flyovers as well. The  20.3 km DART project will commence at Gerezani & City Council BRT station. Which will include Kilwa Road, Chang’ombe Road, Kawawa Road, Gerezani Street, Sokoine Drive and Bandari Road.

Phase III 
Funding for the 3rd phase was provided by the International Development Association (IDA). The construction will take place from Gongo La Mboto to City Center, including part of Uhuru Road from Tazara all the way to Kariakoo-Gerezani.

Infrastructure

Stations
There are three types of stations along the route depending on its location and utility:
 Terminals: Terminals are located along the start and end stations for all trunk roads. The Terminals allow transfers between feeder services as well as providing access to various transportation services such as regional buses and private vehicles. Terminals also contain parking lots to allow commuters to leave their cars during the day. 
 Trunk Stations: These are the main stations along the trunk routes. They are accessed via pedestrian crossings and the stations are elevated to provide pedestrians safety. There are four types of trunk stations spaced 500 meters apart along the road (A,B,C and D) depending on the passenger demand.

 Feeder Stations: Feeder stations allow passengers to transfer from feeder routes onto trunk stations.

Buses 
The BRT system operates a fleet of 140 Golden Dragon buses. There are two types of buses operated along the routes, one which is 18 meters long with a carrying capacity of 150 passengers and the other which is 12 meters long with a carrying capacity of 80 passengers. In January fleet size increased to 210, followed with the addition of UAE firm's 95 buses, bringing the total to 310.

Routes and Stations 

There are six planned phases that will serve over 90% of the city's population and currently only Phase I is operational. Phase II is on construction.

  Phase I from Kimara to Kawawa North to Msimbazi Street ending at Kivukoni: 20.9 km
  Phase II from Kilwa to Kivukoni plus Kawawa south to Kilwa road: 19.3 km
  Phase III from Airport to Uhuru Street along Nyerere Road: 23.6 km
  Phase IV along Bagamoyo Road and Sam Nujoma Road: 16.1 km
  Phase V along Mandela Road: 22.8 km
  Phase VI along Old Bagamoyo Road: 27.6 km

Awards
 2017 : Institute for Transport and Development Policy : Sustainable Transport Award.
 2018 : Institute for Transport and Development Policy : Sustainable Transit Global Award.

See also
 Dar es Salaam commuter rail
 List of bus rapid transit systems

References

External links 
Official website of DART
A map of the Phase 1 routes showing connections with other bus routes can be downloaded here. 

Bus rapid transit in Africa
Transport in Dar es Salaam
Bus stations in Tanzania